Gerhard Gleirscher (born 14 December 1969) is an Austrian luger who competed from 1990 to 2000. He won a complete set of medals at the FIL World Luge Championships with a gold in mixed team (1997), a silver in mixed team (1991) and a bronze in men's singles (1997).

Competing in three Winter Olympics, Gleirscher also finished seventh in the men's doubles event in 1992 and in the men's singles event both in 1994 and in 1998.

His best overall finish in the Luge World Cup was third in the men's singles in 1997-8.

Family 
Gerhard Gleirscher's son, David, won a gold medal at the men's singles luge event at the 2018 Winter Olympics.

References

1992 luge men's doubles results
1994 luge men's singles results
1998 luge men's singles results
FIL-Luge profile

External links 
 
 
 

1969 births
Living people
Austrian male lugers
Olympic lugers of Austria
Lugers at the 1992 Winter Olympics
Lugers at the 1994 Winter Olympics
Lugers at the 1998 Winter Olympics